The 2001 Sports Network Cup was a college football postseason poll by The Sports Network website. The Sacred Heart Pioneers finished first in the poll getting 204 points and 15 first place votes to be named the NCAA Division I FCS Mid-Major Football National Champions by the Sports Network. The Dayton Flyers finished second in the polling receiving 194 points and 6 first place votes.

Dropped Out: None.
Others receiving votes (in order of points, minimum of five required): Drake

See also
NCAA Division I FCS Consensus Mid-Major Football National Championship

References

External links
https://web.archive.org/web/20110622082425/http://www.sportsnetwork.com/merge/tsnform.aspx?c=sportsnetwork&page=cfoot2%2Fmisc%2FTSNcup.htm
https://web.archive.org/web/20020613115747/http://www.sportsnetwork.com/default.asp?c=sportsnetwork&page=cfoot2%2Fmisc%2FTSN-MID-MAJOR.htm

College football championship trophies